Hüseynbəyli is a municipality and village in the Qazakh Rayon of Azerbaijan. It has a population of 1,468.

References

Populated places in Qazax District